The Hochsimmer is a volcanic cone, in the Eifel Mountains in Germany. It rises near Ettringen in the Rhineland-Palatine county of Mayen-Koblenz. At the summit is an observation tower, the Hochsimmer Tower.

Geography

Location 
The Hochsimmer rises within the High Eifel (East Eifel) around 1.7 km west-northwest of the village of Ettringen. Flowing past its western foot roughly from north to south is part of the middle reaches of the Rhine tributary, the Nette. Through its valley runs the Landesstraße 83, which links Weibern to the northwest with Mayen to the southeast. At the eastern foot of the hill is the L 82 road to Bell, and, at its southern foot is the village of St. Johann.

Height and summits 
The Hochsimmer has two domed summits or kuppen: the West Top is 587.9 m high and the East Top is 583.3 m high. About 600 metres southwest of the summit is the Kleiner Simmer (514.7 m).

Towers 
On the east top of the Hochsimmer stands the 18-metre-high Hochsimmer Tower, an observation tower built in 1909 and 1911. From its viewing platform there is a view of the Eastern High Eifel, the Middle Rhine Basin and of Ettringen; in good visibility, even Cologne Cathedral may be seen. About 30 metres northwest of the viewing tower is a transmission tower.

Gallery

See also 
 List of volcanoes in Germany

References

External links 

Der Hochsimmer…, retrieved 28 November 2013, in Gemeinde Ettringen am Hochsimmer, at ettringen-eifel.de.

Cinder cones
Volcanoes of Germany
Mountains and hills of the Eifel
Mountains and hills of Rhineland-Palatinate
Mayen-Koblenz